Mad River Mountain is a ski and snowboard resort in Valley Hi, Ohio, United States. The resort, which opened in 1962 as Valley Hi Ski Area, is owned and operated by Vail Resorts, who bought the resort from Peak Resorts in 2019.

There are 20 trails of various skill levels, a tubing park, two terrain parks, and two beginner areas. Of the resort's 11 total lifts, there are 6 surface lifts, 3 double chair lifts, 1 triple chair lift, and 1 fixed quad lift. Since the annual natural snowfall averages only , Mad River Mountain has the largest snow making system in Ohio, with 130 snow cannons that cover all of its trails.

The resort lies off U.S. Route 33 east of the city of Bellefontaine. The resort's iconic bar venue called 'The Loft' caught fire on September 16, 2015, and was considered a total loss. Local firm Thomas & Marker Construction was chosen to prepare the resort for the 2015-2016 winter season. The site was demolished and temporary structures were erected in October 2015. A new lodge has been constructed.

Notable employees
In the early 1980s Olympic medalist Putzi Frandl was employed as a ski instructor at the resort. Louie Vito, Olympic snowboard medalist got his start at Mad River Mountain, and sponsors a rail jam and food drive for a local pantry each year.

References

External links
 Mad River Mountain

Ski areas and resorts in Ohio
Buildings and structures in Logan County, Ohio
Tourist attractions in Logan County, Ohio
Vail Resorts